Uththaman is a 1976 Indian Tamil-language film, directed and produced by V. B. Rajendra Prasad. The film stars Sivaji Ganesan and Manjula. It is a remake of the 1973 Hindi film Aa Gale Lag Jaa. The film was released on 25 June 1976.

Plot 
Gopi is a skating instructor and a tourist guide. He meets Radha, falls in love, makes love and gets married to her during a vacation. Later, he finds out that Radha's father is a millionaire and he disdains Gopi. Radha's father and their relatives manipulate the situation in such a manner that it appears to him that Radha regrets marrying Gopi and has buyer's remorse. 

He leaves back to the hill station taking his son only to find out that his son has polio and cannot even walk. Radha meanwhile assumes that Gopi betrayed her and her son is dead. Whether they all get back together or not forms the rest of the dramatic story.

Cast 
Sivaji Ganesan as Gopi/Gopalakrishnan
Manjula as Radha
Master Titto as Raja
K. Balaji as Dr.Ramesh
V. K. Ramasamy as Selvanayagam
Nagesh as Ramu
Major Sundarrajan as Chief doctor
Veeraraghavan as Dr.Moorthy
Pandari Bai as Gopi's mother
Pushpamala as Nurse
Typist Gopu as lyer
Prabhu as Dancer
S. A. Chandrasekhar as Dancer

Soundtrack 
The music was composed by K. V. Mahadevan.

References

External links 
 

1970s Tamil-language films
1976 films
Films directed by V. B. Rajendra Prasad
Films scored by K. V. Mahadevan
Tamil remakes of Hindi films